Hit Bahadur Tamang (born 29 May, 1963) is a Nepali politician and a member of the House of Representatives of the federal parliament of Nepal. He was elected from Nuwakot-1 constituency representing CPN MC of the left alliance, defeating senior Nepali Congress leader, ex-finance minister Ram Saran Mahat. He was elected by a margin of 8,553 votes, receiving 36,473 votes to Mahat's 27,920. He had been a candidate from Nuwakot in both the constituent assembly elections of 2008 and 2013 but lost to Mahat both times.

Previously, he was the Minister for Youth and Sports in the Khanal cabinet.

Early life and career 
Born to a peasant family in Panchakanya VDC-1, Nuwakot, he began his political career from CPN Unity Center and later joined CPN Maoist and rose to become a member of the party's central secretariat. He was active in Unity Center from 1992 to 1996, rising to the posts of district vice-chair and Party central committee member. He joined the maoist party in 1996 and went underground. He had become a central committee member of the party by the time it entered the peace process in 2006. In the interim parliament reinstituted in the aftermath of the 2006 revolution, he was appointed as a member of parliament representing the Maoist party.

He has studied up to Grade 10. He has three children, two daughters and a son.

References

Living people
1963 births
Government ministers of Nepal
Nepal MPs 2017–2022
Nepal Communist Party (NCP) politicians
People from Nuwakot District
Tamang people
Communist Party of Nepal (Maoist Centre) politicians
Nepal MPs 2022–present